The Ancient High House is an Elizabethan town house located on the main street in Stafford. The house was constructed in 1595 by the Dorrington family, from local oak, which anecdotally came from the nearby Doxey Wood, and is the largest timber framed town house in England.

Many of the original timbers bear carpenter's marks indicating that the frame was pre-assembled on the ground and the joints numbered to aid the on-site construction. Some timbers have additional joint housings cut into them, which would suggest that they have been reused from an even earlier structure. It was not unheard of for a building to be dismantled and rebuilt at a different location - hence the expression to 'up-sticks', which means to move house.

At the time of the outbreak of the English Civil War, a member of the Sneed family of Keele Hall, near Newcastle-under-Lyme, was renting the building.

Charles I visited Stafford and stayed at the Ancient High House on 17 and 18 September 1643, not long after raising the Royal Standard at Nottingham, the feudal signal to call his loyal subjects to arms - this act was seen as the start of the English Civil War.

Having made the High House his temporary headquarters, the King talked to his advisers and dictating letters and military orders for the forthcoming campaign (some of these have been preserved in the nearby William Salt Library). While in Stafford the King attended St Mary's Collegiate Church, an account being made by a local woman for the strewing of flowers along his route to the church.

There is a story that while walking in the garden of the High House with the King, Prince Rupert fired two shots through the tail of the weather vane of St Mary's in order to demonstrate the accuracy of a continental Horse Pistol. The weather vane was removed several centuries ago, and so the story cannot be verified, although the pistol Prince Rupert is said to have fired was far more accurate than most of the weapons then in use.

In May 1643, the King's enemies, the Parliamentarians, captured the town and in the following January, the newly established Committee of Stafford ordered:

These prisoners were Royalists.

The main room of the house would have been the central room on the first floor, and it is here that guests, including King Charles I and Prince Rupert, would have been entertained. Today a tableau represents the scene during the visit of the King who stayed as a guest of Captain Richard Sneed. The King was accompanied by his nephew, Prince Rupert of the Rhine (and his Standard Poodle called 'Boy'), who was already an accomplished military commander.

The structure was weakened by renovations to the ground floor in the 19th century. This work included the knocking-through of a stone fireplace to create a corridor and the removal of one of the corner posts, which lead to a splaying of the overhanging upper storeys. A second chimney was demolished to create more space, this taking place following the advent of electricity when the rooms were presumably kept warm in winter by portable heaters.

There were rumours that the High house was going to have to be demolished due to the amount of work that was needed. It was then that the townsfolk got together and a group was formed to raise funds to "save the Ancient High House". At weekends people would have stalls selling souvenirs and encouraging people to donate. Local band "the Climax Blues Band" held an event at a local night club and raised a substantial amount towards the cause. There was talk of a "Blue Plaque" to commemorate the band's efforts, sadly this never transpired.

The Ancient High House is now largely a historic house museum with a collection of period room furnishings and displays, including the English Civil War, Edwardian and Victorian eras. Three galleries feature changing art, photography and history exhibitions.  The museum is operated by the Stafford Borough Council and entry is free of charge. The Staffordshire Yeomanry Museum is housed in the attic floor, and features uniforms and artefacts of the Staffordshire Yeomanry.

The Ancient High House adjoins 'Shaw's House' and the 'Swan', both of which have Elizabethan origins, while close by may be found St Chad's Church and the Collegiate Church of St Mary's, Stafford.

References

External links
  - Main Website
Ancient High House - Stafford Borough Council, official site

Buildings and structures in Stafford
Historic house museums in Staffordshire
Timber framed buildings in Staffordshire
Houses completed in 1594